Vera Schäferkordt (born 9 December 1924) is a German former swimmer. She competed in two events at the 1952 Summer Olympics.

References

External links
  

1924 births
Possibly living people
German female swimmers
Olympic swimmers of Germany
Swimmers at the 1952 Summer Olympics
Sportspeople from Düsseldorf
German female freestyle swimmers